Simmie or Simmy is a given name and a place name. Notable people and places with this name include:

People 

 Simmie Cobbs Jr. (born 1995), American football player
 Simeon Blind Simmie Dooley (1881–1961), American country blues singer and guitarist
 Simmie Hill (1946–2013), American basketball player
 Simmie Knox (born 1935), American painter
 Simeon Simmy Murch (1880–1939), American baseball player
Neil Simpson (born 1961), Scottish footballer nicknamed "Simmie"
 Simmy Simmons, the female lead character in the 1933 film The Women in His Life
Sigmar Vilhjálmsson (born 1977), Icelandic television host nicknamed "Simmi"
 Simmy, South African singer-songwriter

Places 

Simmie, Queensland, a locality in the Maranoa Region, Australia
Simmie, Saskatchewan, a hamlet in Canada
Simmy Island, a townland in Killyleagh, Northern Ireland